Haji Aman Ullah Warraich is a Pakistani politician who had been a Member of the Provincial Assembly of the Punjab from August 2018 till January 2023.

Political career

He was elected to the Provincial Assembly of the Punjab as a candidate of Pakistan Muslim League (N) from Constituency PP-62 (Gujranwala-XII) in 2018 Pakistani general election.

1991. Was elected as Member Zilla Council Gujranwala.

1996. Was elected as Member District  council Gujranwala.

References

External links
Punjab Assembly profile

Living people
Punjab MPAs 2018–2023
Pakistan Muslim League (N) MPAs (Punjab)
Year of birth missing (living people)